WEBJ (1240 AM) is the oldest radio station in Brewton, Alabama, United States, going on air in 1947. The station serves the Brewton area with a news/talk format. The station broadcasts at 1000 watts and the transmitter is located near downtown Brewton.

Programming
The format of the radio station was changed from oldies music to a news/talk format in 2003. The station's slogan is now "All talk, All the time."

August 1, 2012, marked WEBJ's 65th anniversary of signing on air.

History
WEBJ began broadcasting Aug. 1, 1947, on 1240 kHz with 250 W power. The station was owned by William E. Brooks, with studios in the Lovelace Hotel in Brewton.

References

External links

EBJ
News and talk radio stations in the United States
Radio stations established in 1947
1947 establishments in Alabama